Kusma may refer to:

Kaunan - a letter of the Runic alphabet
Kusma, Parbat - The capital of Parbat District, Nepal.
Kusma, Parasi - village in Nawalparasi District, Nepal
Kusma, Tartu County, village in Peipsiääre Parish, Tartu County, Estonia
Kusma, Võru County, village in Võru Parish, Võru County, Estonia
 Kusma, the Hungarian-language name for Cuşma village, Livezile Commune, Bistriţa-Năsăud County, Romania

See also
Cusma (disambiguation)
Kuzma (disambiguation)